Harbor Drive Pedestrian Bridge is a pedestrian and bicycle crossing over the San Diego Trolley and San Diego & Arizona Eastern Railroad tracks in downtown San Diego, California. The bridge connects otherwise disconnected segments of Park Boulevard, allowing pedestrians easier access between Petco Park/East Village and the waterfront. The span measures  while the remainder is approaches.

Completed in March 2011, the bridge was built to allow pedestrian traffic on Park Boulevard to safely cross 6 sets of railroad tracks and Harbor Drive.  The bridge also completes the "Park to Bay Link" a long term vision of City planners to develop a public parkway or greenbelt along Park Blvd in order to connect Balboa Park with San Diego Bay. The bridge crosses over six lanes of traffic on Harbor Drive, a rail yard and trolley tracks, and connects the convention center with the Gaslamp Quarter and East Village. It is accessible by stairs and elevators.

The unusual, iconic structure features a curved concrete deck that is suspended only on the deck's inside curve by a single pair of suspension cables. The bridge was constructed using stainless steel and has lighting above and below the deck. It has been described as "a sleek, nautically themed bridge with a very nice view of the city."

The Harbor Drive Pedestrian Bridge was built by Reyes Construction, Inc. T.Y. Lin International engineered the project, and Safdie Rabines Architects was project architect. It cost $26.8 million and was funded in part by a $6 million grant from the California Transportation Commission.

References

Bridges completed in 2011
Pedestrian bridges in California
Bridges in San Diego
Steel bridges in the United States
Cable-stayed bridges in the United States